Goodenia salmoniana is a species of flowering plant in the family Goodeniaceae and only known from the type specimen collected in Western Australia in 1889. It an erect to ascending herb, with linear leaves and racemes of dark yellow flowers.

Description

Taxonomy and naming
This species was first formally described in 1892 by Ferdinand von Mueller who gave it the name Velleia salmoniana in The Victorian Naturalist from material collected near the Gascoyne River by Lady Margaret Forrest. In 1990 Roger Charles Carolin changed the name to Goodenia salmoniana in the journal Telopea. The specific epithet honours George Salmon.

Distribution
This goodenia is only known from the type specimen, collected at an unknown location near the Gascoyne River in Western Australia.

Conservation status
Goodenia salmoniana is classified as "Priority One" by the Government of Western Australia Department of Parks and Wildlife, meaning that it is known from only one or a few locations which are potentially at risk.

References

salmoniana
Eudicots of Western Australia
Plants described in 1892
Taxa named by Ferdinand von Mueller